Pavel Barbalat (29 May 1935 – May 2004) was a Moldovan jurist and judge. He was the first President of the Constitutional Court of Moldova.

References 

1935 births
2004 deaths
Constitutional Court of Moldova judges